This list of St Helens R.F.C. coaches details the records and achievements of coaches at the club.

St. Helens Rugby Football Club currently play in the Super League, a rugby league football competition.

Coaches
This list shows the coaches who have held the reins at Knowsley Road since 1945.

Win percentage is rounded to one decimal place. The names of any caretaker coaches are supplied where known, and these periods are highlighted in italics.

Key

M: Matches played
W: Matches won
D: Matches drawn
L: Matches lost

References

St Helens R.F.C.
St. Helens